Stahlwille (officially Stahlwille Eduard Wille GmbH & Co. KG, sometimes styled STAHLWILLE) is a German engineering company. It was founded in 1862 by 25-year-old Eduard Wille to manufacture pokers and fire-tongs then specialised in various forged steel tools. Based in the Cronenberg district of Wuppertal, Germany, with several German production plants, Stahlwille manufactures hand tools for automotive, industrial, and aerospace use. 

Stahlwille has eight subsidiary companies in Europe, one in USA, and one in China. In addition, its worldwide partners are available to end users to offer valuable hints and advice, in the same way as the experienced application engineers at Stahlwille.

External links
 Stahlwille official English website
 Stahlwille official UK site

Tool manufacturing companies of Germany
German brands
Automotive tool manufacturers
Companies based in North Rhine-Westphalia